Stepney was an ancient civil and ecclesiastical parish in the historic county of Middlesex to the east and north east of the City of London, England.

Origins
The parish had Anglo-Saxon origins as the vill of Stepney, a larger area including Hackney and Bromley-by-Bow. The vill was under the direct jurisdiction of the Bishops of London, and was centred on a church that eventually was dedicated to St Dunstan. The parish was included in the returns of the Bills of mortality from 1636.

It was a large parish and contained a number of distinct communities, comprising much of what became the East End of London. The area witnessed a very large increase in population from the beginning of the 17th century due both to the development of the docks and the suburban expansion of London. This led to the various parts of Stepney gradually being constituted as separate parishes. The final division of the parish of Stepney took place in 1866.

Governance
The parish had an open vestry until 1589. It was replaced with a select vestry of 32 members, eight from each of Ratcliffe, Limehouse, Poplar, and Mile End with Bethnal Green. Elections took place every five years, with the number of members increased to 40.

Component areas and division of parish
Stepney had a number of well-defined subdivisions which were eventually constituted parishes in their own right. The vestries of these parishes were entrusted with a number of purely local government or "civil" functions such as highway maintenance and relief of the poor. Until 1837, when a number of new ecclesiastical parishes were formed, the boundaries of the civil and Church of England parishes were identical. By 1890 the ancient parish was divided between 67 Anglican parishes (a number later greatly reduced) which had little relation to the civil boundaries and are not listed here.

Legacy
In 1895, the title Bishop of Stepney was given to a new suffragan in the Diocese of London responsible for an area of East London approximating to the ancient parish.
The name was revived for local government in 1900 when the Metropolitan Borough of Stepney was formed covering part of the ancient parish. The area of the parish now makes up the majority of the London Borough of Tower Hamlets.

References

History of the London Borough of Tower Hamlets
Former civil parishes in London
Bills of mortality parishes